Monticupes is an extinct genus of Ommatine beetle. The genus is characterised by "moderately oval body, subtriangular or long (subparallelsided) head with large eyes and well raised temples, pronotum carinate and with subexplanate sides, veins well expressed with fused A1 and Cu at apex and their common vein ending on Sc, explanate elytral sides moderately wide and with diffuse small microtubercles, and abdominal ventrites co-planar (abutting)."

Species 

 †Monticupes curtinervis Tan et al. 2007 Yixian Formation, China, Aptian
 †Monticupes decorosus Tan et al. 2012 Daohugou, China, Callovian
 †Monticupes fentaiensis Ren 1995 Lushangfen Formation, China, Aptian
 †Monticupes surrectus Ren 1995 Lushangfen Formation, China, Aptian

References

Ommatidae
Prehistoric beetle genera